Atama soup is a vegetable and palm nut soup that originates from the Efik People of Cross River State in South South Nigeria. It is popularly known amongst the Cross River and Akwa Ibom State People of Nigeria. The soup is made from palm kernel; the extract of oil obtained from the palm kernel is what is used to make the soup. Ingredients for preparing it include: fresh palm kernel, onions, salt, and others.

See also 
 Afang (soup)
 Edikang ikong
 Editan (soup)
 Nigerian cuisine
 List of soups
 Vegetable soup
 List of vegetable soups

References 

Nigerian cuisine
African soups
Vegetable soups